In positional astronomy, two astronomical objects are said to be in opposition when they are on opposite sides of the celestial sphere, as observed from a given body (usually Earth).

A planet (or asteroid or comet) is said to be "in opposition" or "at opposition" when it is in opposition to the Sun. Because most orbits in the Solar System are nearly coplanar to the ecliptic, this occurs when the Sun, Earth, and the body are configured in an approximately straight line, or syzygy; that is, Earth and the body are in the same direction as seen from the Sun. Opposition occurs only for superior planets (see the diagram).

The instant of opposition is defined as that when the apparent geocentric celestial longitude of the body differs by 180° from the apparent geocentric longitude of the Sun. 
At that time, a body is:
 in apparent retrograde motion 
 visible almost all night – rising around sunset, culminating around midnight, and setting around sunrise

 at the point in its orbit where it is roughly closest to Earth, making it appear larger and brighter 
 nearly completely sunlit; the planet shows a full phase, analogous to a full moon
 at the place where the opposition effect increases the reflected light from bodies with unobscured rough surfaces

The Moon, which orbits Earth rather than the Sun, is in approximate opposition to the Sun at full moon. A more exact opposition occasionally occurs with mathematical regularity if the Moon is at its usual sun and Earth-aligning point so that it appears full and happens to be aligning with the ecliptic (Earth's orbital plane) during the descending or ascending phase of its 5° inclined (tilted) orbit, which is more concisely termed at a node of its orbit, in which case, a lunar eclipse occurs.  A more exact, shaded form is when a central area of the earth aligns more precisely: a central lunar eclipse, of which there were 14 in the 50 years to 2000, others being penumbral.

The astronomical symbol for opposition is ☍ (U+260D).

Seen from a superior planet, an inferior planet on the opposite side of the Sun is in superior conjunction with the Sun. An inferior conjunction occurs when the two planets align on the same side of the Sun. At inferior conjunction, the superior planet is "in opposition" to the Sun as seen from the inferior planet (see the diagram).

Average interval between oppositions
When two planets are on the same side of the sun then from the point of view of the interior planet the other planet is in opposition with the sun. When two planets are on opposite sides of the sun, there is an opposition from the point of view of the sun. In either case, the interval between two such occurrences involving the same two planets is not constant because the orbits are not circular and because the planets perturb one another. But the average interval between them can be calculated from the periods of the two planets. The "speed" at which a planet goes around the sun, in terms of revolutions per time, is given by the inverse of its period, and the speed difference between two planets is the difference between these. Since the time interval between two oppositions is the time it takes for 360° to be covered by that speed difference, the average interval is:

The following table gives these average intervals, in years, for combinations of the eight planets.

See also

 Conjunction
 Phase angle
 Spherical astronomy
 Syzygy

References

External links
Asteroids around opposition – British Astronomical Association – Computing Section.

Astrometry
Observational astronomy